Lupinus angustifolius is a species of lupin known by many common names, including narrowleaf lupin, narrow-leaved lupin and blue lupin. It is native to Eurasia and northern Africa and naturalized in parts of Australia and North America. It has been cultivated for over 6000 years as a food crop for its edible legume seeds, as a fodder for livestock and for green manure.

Biology
Like other legumes, the narrow-leaved lupin fixes nitrogen in a symbiotic interaction with different bacteria in the rhizosphere. Bacteria living in this rhizosphere include Bradyrhizobium lupinii or the newly discovered species Kribbella lupini.
The narrow-leaved lupin is an erect, branching herb sometimes exceeding one meter. There are reduced-branching cultivars. Each palmate leaf is divided into 5 to 9 linear leaflets under 4 centimeters long. The herbage is slightly hairy in some areas. The inflorescence bears many flowers in shades of blue, violet, pink, or white. The fruit is a legume pod containing seeds of varying colors from dark gray to brown to white, or speckled or mottled.
Lupinus angustifolius has a high content of alkaloids, e.g. lupanin or angustifolin. However, cultivars with a low alkaloid content have been bred. These low alkaloid cultivars are called sweet lupins, such as the Australian Sweet Lupin.

Agronomy
The narrow-leaved lupin is sown as early as possible in the spring, to have the growing season as long as possible. Another reason for early sowing is its sensitivity to high temperature in spring. Lupins react with a higher yield loss, when they are sown late, than other crops (e.g. cereals) do. The optimum seed density depends on the site yield potential  and is generally higher in non-branching cultivars than in branching ones. The variance is high, 14 to 138 plants per m2  are an optimal plant density, depending on the yield potential of the site. On most grounds, a plant density around 80 plants per m2 would be the optimum.

Lupins are usually sown with technique used for cereals in a depth of about 5 cm.

The narrow-leaved lupin needs to be harvested as soon as the grain reaches a moisture of about 12%. The straw usually isn't ripened at this point, but further delay of harvest would increase losses from shattering of the pods and lodging. The harvest is done with machinery used for cereals. Swathing is not widely applied. However, it can be a good  alternative to reduce harvest losses in case harvest is delayed.

The disease and weed spectrum of the narrow-leaved lupin is different from most major crops and it is able to improve the soil (see Use). Therefore, it is a valuable partner in intensive crop rotations.

Use
The plant is used as a green manure or as a grain legume for animal feed or human consumption. Through its ability to fix nitrogen and its low nutrient requirement this plant is suitable to be planted on exhausted fields as a soil improver. Additionally, lupins have strong roots, that can reduce the compaction of a soil.

The whole plant, including the seeds, is widely used as a fodder for livestock, due to its high protein and energy content. Lupins contain high levels of fermentable carbohydrates and low levels of starch and are, therefore, an adequate ruminant feed. But lupins are a valuable feed for monogastric animals as well, because of the high digestibility of the lupin nitrogen and the low level of protease inhibitors.

Lupins are mainly consumed as fermented foods, bread and pasta products, milk products or sprouts. As of 2020, only 4% of lupin were consumed by humans, with the majority used as stock feed. Lupin beans are growing in use as a plant-based protein source in the world marketplace.

Genomics
This species of lupin had its genome sequenced in May 2013.  It was sequenced due to the interest in low alkaloid mutants as a food crop. L. angustifolius has a protein content of 35-40% in the seeds thus for providing protein to people of the world it is of high interest. Currently lupin is grown in Australia and sold under the name "Australian sweet lupin". The objective was to figure out how agronomic traits, low alkaloid traits, and protein content are manifested in the genome. The genome was sequenced in two cultivars, the poorly adapted tanjil and the better adapted unicrop. The genome was sequenced as such; whole genome shotgun sequencing dataset for this species with 26.9x (average amount of overlapping scaffolds) coverage of the genome, then NGS-based RAD-sequencing technology was used to obtain 8,244 sequence-defined markers. A total of 4,214 scaffolds from the genome sequence was assembled and aligned with the genetic map.

References

Further reading
Zhukovsky, P.M. (1929). A contribution to the knowledge of genus Lupinus Tourn.  Bull. Apll. Bot. Gen. Pl.-Breed., Leningrad-Moscow, XXI, I:16-294.
Gladstones, J.S. (1998). Distribution, Origin, Taxonomy, History and Importance. In: J.S. Gladstones et al. (eds.), Lupin as Crop Plants. Biology, Production and Utilization. 1-39.

angustifolius
Flora of Europe
Flora of North Africa
Flora of Western Asia
Plants described in 1753
Taxa named by Carl Linnaeus